A skate spot is a location used for skateboarding. 

A range of locations qualify as a skate spots, as any area where you can ride your skateboard can be considered a skate spot. From the flat ground basketball courts at Thompkins Square Park to the large concrete ledges of Hubba Hideout, skate spots exist in every shape in every city. Not all skate spots last forever. In some instances, the local skateboarding community rallies together to attempt to save a treasured skate spot, such as with the Brooklyn Banks. Skate spots are sometimes turned into DIY skateparks when skateboarders bring in obstacles and cement to make their own terrain.

List of skate spots

B 
 Barcelona Museum of Contemporary Art
 Brooklyn Banks

C 
 China Banks

E 
 El Toro 
 Embarcadero (San Francisco)
 EZ-7

H 
 Harrow Skate Park
 Hollywood High School
 Hubba Hideout

L 
 Love Park

N 
 Nude Bowl

R 
 Rincon bleachers
 The Rom

W 
 Wallenberg Set
 West LA Courthouse skate plaza

References 

Skateboarding
Skateboarding spots